The Municipality of Brenda – Waskada is a rural municipality (RM) in the Canadian province of Manitoba.

History

The RM was incorporated on January 1, 2015 via the amalgamation of the RM of Brenda and the Village of Waskada. It was formed as a requirement of The Municipal Amalgamations Act, which required that municipalities with a population less than 1,000 amalgamate with one or more neighbouring municipalities by 2015. The Government of Manitoba initiated these amalgamations in order for municipalities to meet the 1997 minimum population requirement of 1,000 to incorporate a municipality.

Geography
The RM is located in the southwest corner of Manitoba.  It southern boundary is the Canada–United States border opposite Bottineau County, North Dakota, however, there is no direct access to the U.S. from the RM.

Communities 
 Goodlands
 Medora
 Napinka
 Waskada

Demographics 

References 

2015 establishments in Manitoba
Manitoba municipal amalgamations, 2015
Populated places established in 2015
Rural municipalities in Manitoba